Lovénvatnet is a lake in Oscar II Land at Spitsbergen, Svalbard. The lake is named after Swedish zoologist Sven Ludvig Lovén. It is located between the mountain ridges of Värmlandryggen and Geologryggen.

See also 
Lovénberget

References

Lakes of Spitsbergen